Themisto gaudichaudii is an amphipod crustacean of the suborder Hyperiidea.

Relatives
The 260 species of hyperiid amphipods are large-eyed and planktonic amphipods, whereas gammarid amphipods have smaller eyes and tend to live on the sea floor. The handful of species of the genus Themisto are the most abundant of all amphipods. Unlike other hyperiids, which parasitise gelatinous animals such as salps and jellyfish, Themisto swims free in the plankton, and is much sleeker and more streamlined than other amphipods. Themisto often forms dense swarms, similar to krill swarms.

Themisto gaudichaudii is a voracious predator of anything smaller than itself, and occasionally of animals its own size or larger. In most places, the most abundant members of the plankton community are copepods, which make up the bulk of the diet of T. gaudichaudii, but it also eats fish larvae, chaetognaths, pteropods, juvenile krill, and anything else it comes across. The long limbs are folded against the body for swimming, and extend to catch prey in a similar way to the praying mantis.

Ecology
T. gaudichaudii is the Southern Ocean species of the genus, ranging through the Antarctic region and further north onto Southern Hemisphere continental shelves. In many places, it is the most abundant predator in the plankton, and is often the third-most abundant member of the plankton community, after copepods and krill.

T. gaudichaudii is an important prey item for predators such as the macaroni penguin and icefish, as well as many species of seabirds, notably diving petrels.

Description
Adults off Southern Africa are smaller, reaching .

Taxonomic history

Themisto gaudichaudii was first described by Félix Édouard Guérin-Méneville in 1825. Since the genus was then monotypic, T. gaudichaudii became the type species of the genus Themisto. The type material was collected "" (off the coast of the Falkland Islands).

References

Hyperiidea
Crustaceans of the Atlantic Ocean
Crustaceans of the Indian Ocean
Crustaceans of the Pacific Ocean
Fauna of the Southern Ocean
Crustaceans described in 1825
Taxa named by Félix Édouard Guérin-Méneville